Margaret Jackson may refer to:

Margaret Jackson (born 17 March 1953), Australian corporate executive.
Margaret Jackson (climber) (1843–1906), mountaineer
Margaret Jackson (secretary) (1917–2013), Principal secretary to the Director General of the SOE, member of the OEEC, and Southwark Councillor

See also
Margaret Beckett, born Margaret Jackson